SITE Intelligence Group is an American for-profit consultancy group that tracks online activity of white supremacist and jihadist organizations. It is led by the Israeli analyst Rita Katz and based in Bethesda, Maryland. From 2002 to 2008 Katz headed an organization called SITE Institute. 

The bulk of the materials on the SITE website are available by paid subscription.

On September 2, 2014, SITE sent the video of Steven Sotloff's apparent beheading to its subscribers before the Islamic State of Iraq and the Levant released the video.

References

External links 
 - Not accessible by general public
New Yorker profile

Intelligence websites
Companies based in Bethesda, Maryland
Mass media companies established in 2008
American companies established in 2008
2008 establishments in Maryland